Ralph Greenley Johnstone (September 18, 1880 – November 17, 1910) was the first American person to die while piloting an airplane that crashed. He and Archibald Hoxsey were known as the "heavenly twins" for their attempts to break altitude records.

Biography
Johnstone was born on September 18, 1880, in Parsons, Kansas.

Johnstone started as a vaudeville trick bicycle rider who performed a midair forward somersault. He became a Wright exhibition team pilot. On August 17, 1910, he survived a crash at Asbury Park, New Jersey.

On October 27, 1910, the International Aviation Tournament was held at the Belmont Park racetrack in Elmont, New York. The meet offered $3,750 for the highest altitude, another $1,000 for a world record and a $5,000 bonus for exceeding 10,000 feet. Johnstone set a new American flight altitude record of 8,471 feet. During the flight, a gust of wind forced him to fly backwards, and he landed near Artist Lake in Middle Island, New York.

Johnstone died on November 17, 1910, in Denver, Colorado, in an air crash. Johnstone's Model B was still fairly new. Surviving photos of the wreckage show the parts/components still gleaming with factory fresh paint. Johnstone had damaged the wing of the plane on a previous landing and superficially repaired the wing. Not properly repaired, the wing collapsed during his next high altitude flight, and Johnstone plunged to his death in full view of the crowd.

Legacy
Johnstone had two children – a daughter, Ethel Johnstone (born 1905), and a son, Ralph Ernest Johnstone (born 1904), who became a well-known and talented tattoo artist and circus banner painter.

A New York State Historic Plaque commemorating the landing at Artist Lake can be found at the lake along New York State Route 25 in Middle Island. On the ground Ralph was pals with Hoxsey and rival Curtiss team member Eugene Ely.

See also
List of fatalities from aviation accidents

References

External links

Ralph Johnstone at Early Aviators
Ralph Johnstone at Centennial of Flight

1880 births
1910 deaths
Aviators killed in aviation accidents or incidents in the United States
Wright brothers
Vaudeville performers
Accidental deaths in Colorado
People from Parsons, Kansas
Flight altitude record holders
Victims of aviation accidents or incidents in 1910
American aviation record holders